The 1982 Hamilton Tiger-Cats season was the 25th season for the team in the Canadian Football League and their 33rd overall. The Tiger-Cats finished in 2nd place in the East Division with an 8–7–1 record. They lost to the Ottawa Rough Riders in the East Semi-Final.

Preseason

Regular season

Season Standings

Season schedule

Postseason

Schedule

Awards and honours
CFL's Most Outstanding Canadian Award – Rocky DiPietro (SB)
Vince Scott was elected into the Canadian Football Hall of Fame as a Player on May 28, 1982.

1982 All-Stars
Keith Baker, Wide receiver
Ben Zambiasi, Linebacker
David Shaw, Defensive back

References

External links
 1982 Hamilton Tiger-Cats at CFLdb

Hamilton Tiger-cats Season, 1982
Hamilton Tiger-Cats seasons